Metrosideros operculata is a species of flowering plant in the family Myrtaceae. It is endemic to New Caledonia.  It usually grows as a shrub to 3 metres in height, or rarely as a small tree to 10 metres. Stems are square in section and covered with silky hairs.  The stiff, pointed leaves have a slightly revolute margin and are linear to elliptic in shape. They are 12 to 40 mm long and 3 to 10 mm wide. White, pink or red flowers with 3 petals and between 50 and 120 stamens are produced in axillary inflorescences.

Two varieties are currently recognised:
M. operculata var. francii    J.W. Dawson
M. operculata Labill. var. operculata

References

operculata
Endemic flora of New Caledonia
Taxa named by Jacques Labillardière